The following radio stations broadcast on FM frequency 103.7 MHz:

Argentina
 Metropolitana in Rosario, Santa Fe
 Radio María in Pilar, Santa Fe

Australia
 2KY in Moree, New South Wales
 2NUR in Newcastle, New South Wales
 3WAY in Warrnambool, Victoria
 4MBS in Brisbane, Queensland
 ABC Classic FM in Broken Hill, New South Wales
 ABC Classic FM in Swan Hill, Victoria
 3MRR in Mansfield, Victoria
 7LTN in Launceston, Tasmania
 Radio TAB in Longreach, Queensland

Canada (Channel 279)
 CBF-FM-19 in La Tuque, Quebec
 CBPD-FM in Port Hardy, British Columbia
 CBVB-FM in Chandler, Quebec
 CBZA-FM in Grand Manan, New Brunswick
 CFBU-FM in St. Catharines, Ontario
 CFID-FM in Acton Vale, Quebec
 CFVR-FM in Fort McMurray, Alberta
 CHFA-7-FM in Falher, Alberta
 CHHP-FM in Cypress Hills Provincial Park, Saskatchewan
 CHPV-FM in Scotstown, Quebec
 CHWH-FM in West Hawk Lake, Manitoba
 CIEL-FM in Riviere-Du-Loup, Quebec
 CJPT-FM in Brockville, Ontario
 CKGF-3-FM in Rock Creek, British Columbia
 CKQK-FM-1 in Elmira, Prince Edward Island
 CKRK-FM in Kahnawake, Quebec
 CKUA-FM-8 in Edson, Alberta
 VF2373 in New Denver, British Columbia
 VF2559 in Pemberton, British Columbia

China 
 CNR The Voice of China in Chengdu

Ireland
 C103 in north County Cork

Malaysia
 Era in Ipoh, Kuala Kangsar, Central Perak, South Perak, Hilir Perak and North Selangor
 Labuan FM in Labuan
 Melody in Kuching, Sarawak
 Raaga in Johor Bahru, Johor and Singapore

Mexico
 XHCEL-FM in Celaya (Praderas de la Soledad), Guanajuato
 XHCME-FM in Melchor Ocampo, Estado de México
 XHCS-FM in Veracruz, Veracruz
 XHCSEW-FM in Palenque, Chiapas
 XHDGO-FM in Durango, Durango
 XHEMU-FM in Piedras Negras, Coahuila
 XHFMTU-FM in Monterrey, Nuevo León
 XHGYM-FM in Guaymas, Sonora
 XHHEM-FM in Chihuahua, Chihuahua
 XHIR-FM in Ciudad Valles, San Luis Potosí
 XHHUI-FM in Huichapan, Hidalgo
 XHMR-FM in Aguascalientes, Aguascalientes
 XHPATZ-FM in Pátzcuaro, Michoacán
 XHRNV-FM in Naranjos, Veracruz
 XHQY-FM in Toluca, Estado de México
 XHWL-FM in Nuevo Laredo, Tamaulipas
 XHZPC-FM in Jojutla, Morelos

Laos
 Lao National Radio

Philippines
• DYRX in Roxas

Russia
 Radio MAXIMUM in Moscow

United Kingdom
 Channel 103 in Jersey, Channel Islands.

Isle of Man
Manx Radio at Jurby

United States (Channel 279)
  in Little Rock, Arkansas
 KAKR in Akron, Colorado
 KAXA in Mountain Home, Texas
 KBTT in Haughton, Louisiana
 KCDD in Hamlin, Texas
 KDAD in Victor, Idaho
  in Wichita, Kansas
 KFBT in Hanford, California
  in Redfield, South Dakota
  in La Porte, Texas
 KHTP in Tacoma, Washington
 KIHL-LP in Hilo, Hawaii
  in Newberry Springs, California
  in Lebanon, Missouri
  in Bemidji, Minnesota
 KKSG-LP in Worland, Wyoming
 KLKK in Clear Lake, Iowa
  in Questa, New Mexico
  in Garberville, California
 KLWB-FM in Carencro, Louisiana
  in Waite Park, Minnesota
 KMHK in Billings, Montana
 KMLA in El Rio, California
  in Alamogordo, New Mexico
 KNRQ in Harrisburg, Oregon
  in Carnelian Bay, California
 KOSF in San Francisco, California
 KPAR-LP in Dickinson, North Dakota
 KPZA-FM in Jal, New Mexico
 KQBM-LP in West Point, California
  in Casper, Wyoming
 KRDX in Corona de Tucson, Arizona
  in Sioux Falls, South Dakota
 KSNN in Ridgway, Colorado
 KSON in San Diego, California
 KVIL in Highland Park-Dallas, Texas
 KWEP-LP in Elk Park, Montana
 KWJV-LP in Weslaco, Texas
 KWOL-LP in Arroyo Grande, California
 KXAI in Odem, Texas
  in Glenwood, Iowa
 KXZK in Vail, Arizona
 KYLK in Okemah, Oklahoma
 KYVA-FM in Grants, New Mexico
 KZAI in Balcones Heights, Texas
 KZGL in Flagstaff, Arizona
  in Campton, Kentucky
  in Beckley, West Virginia
  in Pemberville, Ohio
  in South Haven, Michigan
  in Lewisburg, Pennsylvania
 WCZE in Harbor Beach, Michigan
  in Springfield, Illinois
  in Mcconnellsburg, Pennsylvania
 WFFX in Hattiesburg, Mississippi
  in Murray, Kentucky
  in Bloomington, Indiana
  in Frankfort, Kentucky
 WFSJ-LP in Indiana, Pennsylvania
 WGON-LP in Slidell, Louisiana
 WGOO-LP in Fremont, Indiana
 WHHT in Cave City, Kentucky
  in Menominee, Michigan
  in Royal Center, Indiana
 WILT in Wrightsville Beach, North Carolina
 WJAF-LP in Centralia, Illinois
  in Keene, New Hampshire
  in Walden, Tennessee
  in Davenport, Iowa
  in Cusseta, Georgia
  in Atlantic City, New Jersey
 WNNJ in Newton, New Jersey
  in North Conway, New Hampshire
 WPVM-LP in Asheville, North Carolina
  in Trussville, Alabama
  in Ithaca, New York
  in Vero Beach, Florida
  in Fisher, West Virginia
  in Williamston, North Carolina
 WRPC-LP in Hampton, Virginia
  in Erie, Pennsylvania
  in Gainesville, Florida
 WRUX-LP in Atlanta, Georgia
 WSJH in Hubbardston, Michigan
 WSNH-LP in Grand Rapids, Michigan
  in Charlotte, North Carolina
  in Williamston, North Carolina
  in Broxton, Georgia
  in Richmond, Virginia
 WUVS-LP in Muskegon, Michigan
  in Westerly, Rhode Island
  in Irwinton, Georgia
  in Hallie, Wisconsin
 WXCY-FM in Havre de Grace, Maryland
 WXKT in Royston, Georgia
  in Lajas, Puerto Rico
 WXSS in Wauwatosa, Wisconsin
 WYUR in Gilman, Illinois
 WZVL in Philo, Ohio

References

Lists of radio stations by frequency